The Intercity Bridge, more commonly known as the Ford Parkway Bridge (and sometimes referred to as the 46th Street Bridge by residents of Minneapolis), is a reinforced concrete arch bridge that spans the Mississippi River between Minneapolis, Minnesota and St. Paul, Minnesota, United States. It connects 46th Street in Minneapolis with Ford Parkway in Saint Paul. The bridge is historically significant as one of the largest reinforced concrete bridges ever built in Minnesota. It was built in 1925-1927 by James O. Heyworth, Inc. and was designed by Martin Sigvart Grytbak.  The Intercity Bridge was listed on the National Register of Historic Places in 1989.  It is notable as one of the monumental concrete rib-arch bridges spanning the high river bluffs along the Mississippi River, along with the Franklin Avenue Bridge, the Third Avenue Bridge, the 10th Avenue Bridge, and the Robert Street Bridge.

The bridge was originally built to service Ford's Twin Cities Assembly Plant, so Minneapolis residents could commute to the Ford plant.  The Ford plant, along with Lock and Dam No. 1, was expected to make the Highland Park area of St. Paul extremely desirable.  As part of the planned development, St. Paul expanded the original street, Edsel Avenue, and renamed it Ford Parkway.  The bridge project was designed by a committee of politicians and engineers from both Minneapolis and St. Paul and chaired by Charles M. Babcock, Minnesota's first commissioner of highways.  The development that was expected as a result of the bridge did not materialize, however, because of the Great Depression and growth in Minneapolis neighborhoods on the opposite side of the bridge.  It was not until after World War II that the desired growth in the Highland Park area resulted from the bridge.

In 1972-1973, the bridge was redecked and widened, but this did not detract from the historic significance of the bridge.  In 2004, the bridge was rebuilt from the arches up.  The rebuilding project was given an award by the Minnesota Society of Professional Engineers in 2006.

Pictures

See also

List of crossings of the Upper Mississippi River

References

Bridges completed in 1927
Bridges in Minneapolis
Bridges in Saint Paul, Minnesota
Bridges over the Mississippi River
Concrete bridges in the United States
Mississippi Gorge
National Register of Historic Places in Mississippi National River and Recreation Area
National Register of Historic Places in Minneapolis
National Register of Historic Places in Saint Paul, Minnesota
Open-spandrel deck arch bridges in the United States
Road bridges on the National Register of Historic Places in Minnesota
Shared-use paths in Minneapolis